Parolinia is a genus of flowering plants in the family Brassicaceae.

Species
Parolinia filifolia Kunk.
Parolinia glabriuscula Montelongo & Bramwell	
Parolinia intermedia Svent. & Bramwell
Parolinia ornata Webb
Parolinia platypetala G. Kunkel
Parolinia schizogynoides Svent.

References
 The Plant List entry

Brassicaceae
Brassicaceae genera